"" is a song by Italian record producer Mace, with vocals by Blanco and Salmo. It was released by Island Records on 8 January 2021 as the second single from Mace's first album Obe.

The song peaked at number 1 on the FIMI single chart for seven weeks and ranked fifth in the 2021 year-end single chart. "" was certified quintuple platinum in Italy.

Music video
The music video for "", directed by YouNuts!, was released on 11 January 2022 via Mace's YouTube channel. , the video has over 40 million views on YouTube.

Personnel
Credits adapted from Tidal.
 Mace – producer, composer, drum machine
 Venerus – composer
 Blanco – associated performer, author, vocals
 Salmo – associated performer, author, vocals

Charts

Weekly charts

Year-end charts

Certifications

References

2021 songs
2021 singles
Blanco (singer) songs
Songs written by Blanco (singer)